Guadalupe-Reyes Marathon is a concept typical of Spaniard Heritage culture. It began in the decade of the 1970s in Guatemala and 1990s in Mexico and informally refers to the festive period from December 12 (Day of the Virgin of Guadalupe) to January 6 (Day of the Epiphany, popularly known as "Reyes Magos" or Three Wise Men). During this period there are several holidays which, linked together, create a "marathon" of festivities. During this period, the challenge is not only to attend the festivities but to at least drink any type of alcoholic beverage every day. This Marathon is not part of the Mexican Folklore; it is merely a pop-culture activity.

The celebrations linked together by the Guadalupe-Reyes Marathon are:

December 12: Day of the Virgin of Guadalupe.
Every evening from December 16 to December 24: The nine Posadas parties.
December 24: Last posada and Christmas Eve (Nochebuena).
December 25: Christmas
December 28: Holy Innocent's day, akin to April Fool’s Day, which in Mexico is remembered playing practical jokes.
December 31: New Year's Eve
January 1: New Year's Day
January 6: Day of the Epiphany or Three Wise Men ("Reyes Magos")
The last celebration of the season is Day of Candelaria on February 2. In Mexico, this festivity is linked to the feast of the Magi on January 6 by the traditional rosca de reyes. It is also common to celebrate consuming the traditional atole and tamales. However, being almost a month away from all the celebrations that happen in late December and early January, it is excluded from the "Marathon". Common celebrations include consuming alcoholic beverages daily leading up to a mass celebration on the last day of the festival.

The name of the marathon (Guadalupe Reyes) has also been used in advertising. Certain comedy shows  sometimes feature the fictional character of "Guadalupe Reyes", a proper Mexican name which can belong either to a male or a female.

See also
 Public holidays in Mexico

References

Public holidays in Mexico
Winter events in Mexico